ち, in hiragana, or チ in katakana, is one of the Japanese kana, which each represent one mora.

The kanji for one thousand (千, sen), appears similar to チ, and at one time they were related, but today チ is used as phonetic, while the kanji carries an entirely unrelated meaning.

Many onomatopoeic words beginning with ち pertain to things that are small or quick.

The dakuten forms ぢ, ヂ, pronounced the same as the dakuten forms of the shi kana in most dialects (see yotsugana), are uncommon. They are primarily used for indicating a voiced consonant in the middle of a compound word (see rendaku), and they can never begin a word, although some people will write the word for hemorrhoids (normally じ) as ぢ for emphasis. The dakuten form of the shi character is sometimes used when transliterating "di", as opposed to チ's dakuten form; for example, Aladdin is written as アラジン Arajin, and radio is written as ラジオ. More common, though, is to use ディ instead, such as ディオン to translate the name Dion.

In the Ainu language, チ by itself is pronounced , and can be combined with the katakana ヤ, ユ, エ, and ヨ to write the other  sounds as well as  sounds.  The combination チェ (pronounced ), is interchangeable with セ゚.

Stroke order

Other communicative representations

 Full Braille representation

 Computer encodings

See also
Shi (kana)
Hepburn romanization
Kunrei-shiki romanization

References

Specific kana